Der Millionenbauer (The Millionaire) is a German television series.

Plot summary
The German economic boom of the late 1970s led to an increase of land speculation; taking advantage of this, farmer Josef Hartinger makes a fortune selling his land, and gives up farming, living on the millions he'd earned. Deciding to help his children, he buys out their livelihoods: younger son Martin becomes a beverage distributor, whilst daughter Monica becomes a hairdresser with her own salon. His oldest son, Andreas, however, is a farmer, through and through, and, without any land to farm, he emigrates to Canada. Without Andreas's knowledge, however, his father buys him a farm.

Series two primarily concerns Josef Hartinger becoming a local politician, and running for the office of mayor.

Production
Series one was shot on a farm in Anzing, in 1979; the second series was produced in 1986, and broadcast two years later on ARD. Though the cast remained the same, the filming location changed.

Release
Pixis Medien released a DVD, containing all the episodes, on October 12, 2007.

See also
List of German television series

External links
 

1979 German television series debuts
1987 German television series endings
Television shows set in Bavaria
German-language television shows
Das Erste original programming